Oenanthotoxin is a toxin extracted from hemlock water-dropwort (Oenanthe crocata) and other plants of the genus Oenanthe. It is a central nervous system poison, and acts as a noncompetitive antagonist of the neurotransmitter gamma-aminobutyric acid. A case has been made for the presence of this toxin in local Oenanthe species playing a causative role in euthanasia in ancient Sardinia. It was crystallized in 1949 by Clarke and co-workers. It is structurally closely related to the toxins cicutoxin and carotatoxin.  Oenanthotoxin is a C17 polyacetylene isomer of cicutoxin.

Occurrence

Oenanthotoxin concentration in plants is dependent on seasonal changes and geographical location, the most is present during late winter and early spring. Contrary to most poisonous plants that contain bitter tastes or burning sensations, the water dropwort has a rather sweet and pleasant taste and odor.  Water dropwort is characterized by a yellow liquid that changes color due to air exposure. The roots are the most toxic part, although the entire plant contains poisonous properties.

History and culture

The discovery and use of plants containing oenanthotoxin predates Socrates and Homer and its first use as a poison is thought to have been implemented between 1800 BC and 800 BC in Pre-Roman Sardinia. In Ancient Sardinia, it was considered to be a humane form of euthanasia. Elderly people who were unable to care for themselves were given water dropwort and dropped from a high rock to ensure death. It is also believed that Socrates ingested the plant when executed.

A common symptom of oenanthotoxin is risus sardonicus, better known as the Sardonic Grin, coined by Homer in the 8th century BC, due to the victim's rigid smile after ingestion.

Furthermore, as a muscle relaxant, it is believed to have cosmetic botox-like properties in small amounts.

Mechanism of action

Although oenanthotoxin is a relatively well known poison, its mechanism of action is not entirely understood. However, there is evidence that its mechanism of action is similar to that of cicutoxin. 

Oenanthotoxin is part of a group of C17 conjugated polyacetylenes that act as noncompetitive gamma-aminobutyric acid (GABA) inhibitors in the central nervous system (CNS). GABA binds to the beta-domain of the GABAA receptor in the central nervous system and activates the receptor increasing chloride ion flow across the membrane and inhibiting the neuron. When oenanthotoxin is introduced to the body, it non-competitively binds to the same beta-domain receptor as GABA  and prevents normal inhibitory function. Binding to the same receptor, oenanthotoxin blocks the chloride channel, allowing excessive excitation to occur. This, blocking GABAergic responses, causes hyperactivity in the neurons, resulting in convulsions, and seizures.

Symptoms

While oenanthotoxin is extremely dangerous and toxic (LD50 = 0.58 mg/kg for mice), there have been numerous case studies documenting the common symptoms including: convulsions, seizures, nausea, diarrhea, tachycardia, mydriasis, rhabdomyolysis, renal failure, respiratory impairment, and cardiac dysrhythmias.

Below is a comprehensive table listing the recorded symptoms caused oenanthotoxin within each system in the body Oenanthe crocata:

References 

Neurotoxins
Plant toxins
Conjugated enynes
Secondary alcohols
Convulsants
GABAA receptor negative allosteric modulators
Conjugated diynes